Oleksandr Volynets (born 9 October 1974 in Ternopil) is a Ukrainian swimmer who competes in the freestyle events. He has been a scholarship holder with the Olympic Solidarity Program since August 2002.

Achievements
2006 FINA Short Course World Championships - bronze medal (50 m freestyle)
2004 Olympic Games - seventh place (50 m freestyle)
2002 FINA Short Course World Championships - bronze medal (50 m freestyle)
2002 FINA World Cup - silver medal (50 m freestyle)
2000 Olympic Games - eighth place (50 m freestyle)

References
sports-reference

Ternopil
'

1974 births
Living people
Ukrainian male swimmers
Swimmers at the 2000 Summer Olympics
Swimmers at the 2004 Summer Olympics
Olympic swimmers of Ukraine
Ukrainian male freestyle swimmers
Medalists at the FINA World Swimming Championships (25 m)
European Aquatics Championships medalists in swimming
Sportspeople from Ternopil
21st-century Ukrainian people